Sun Princess may refer to:

 Sun Princess (ship), various ships
 Sun Princess (horse), a Thoroughbred racehorse
 Sun Princess, the title given to the second place winner of the Sun and Salsa Festival pageant

See also
 Princess Sun, Northern Yan empress